Los tramposos ("The cheaters") is a 1959 Spanish comedy film directed by Pedro Lazaga and starring Tony Leblanc and Antonio Ozores. The movie is about two small-time con-men.

Plot
Two small-time con men make a living of swindling people. They have a relatively happy life despite some "visits" to Carabanchel Prison. However, one of them, Virgilio, falls in love with the sister of his partner. Since she is not happy about their style of living, they decide to become honest people. Having failed in other jobs, open their own travel agency, which turns out to be a success after some comical incidents.

Critic
Spanish critic Carlos Aguilar in his Guía del cine español considers this film "in his own way, a classic".

References

External links
 

Spanish comedy films
1950s Spanish-language films
1959 films
Films directed by Pedro Lazaga
Films produced by Ricardo Sanz
1959 comedy films
1950s Spanish films